Erik Streňo (born 29 September 1990) is a Slovak football forward who currently plays for FK Humenné in 3. Liga East.

Club career

1. FC Tatran Prešov
Streňo made his professional Fortuna Liga debut for Tatran Prešov against Ružomberok on 16 July 2016.

References

External links
 Fortuna Liga profile
 
 Eurofotbal profile
 Futbalnet profile

1990 births
Living people
Slovak footballers
Association football forwards
MFK Vranov nad Topľou players
Partizán Bardejov players
MFK Zemplín Michalovce players
FK Poprad players
1. FC Tatran Prešov players
FK Humenné players
Slovak Super Liga players
People from Vranov nad Topľou
Sportspeople from the Prešov Region
2. Liga (Slovakia) players